Collyris elegans is a species of beetles in the family Cicindelidae. It is found in Java.
 
Note that, in synonymy, the name Colliuris elegans (Guerin-Meneville, 1855) described a species found in Brazil.

References 

Cicindelidae
Beetles described in 1829
Insects of Java